William Brock may refer to:

William Brock (MP), MP for City of Chester
Bill Brock (1930–2021), American senator
William Brock (Australian politician) (1851–1913), member of the Tasmanian House of Assembly
William Brock (Canadian politician) (1836–1917), Canadian politician
William Brock (pastor) (1807–1875), British nonconformist minister
William A. Brock (born 1941), American economist
William Emerson Brock (1872–1950), American politician, grandfather of Bill Brock
William S. Brock (1895–1932), American aviator
William John Brock (1817–1863), religious writer
William Hodson Brock (born 1936), British chemist and science historian